Sir Edward Keith (d. 17 Oct 1346) was a Scottish nobleman and hereditary 11th Marischal of Scotland.

Biography
Sir Edward Keith was the son of William de Keith (d. ), 8th Marischal of Scotland, and Barbara de Seaton, daughter of Adam de Seaton. In 1328 he received a charter to the lands of Kelly from King Robert the Bruce, witnessed by his brother Robert II Keith, Marischal of Scotland. Neither he nor his brother Robert were at the Battle of Halidon Hill but his son William, fighting under Sir Archibald Douglas was taken prisoner there. He inherited the hereditary Sheriffdom of Selkirk through his first wife, Isabella de Synton. Sir Edward Keith died before 1351 and succeeded by his son William.

Family
Sir Edward Keith married first, before July 1305, Isabella de Synton, daughter of Alexander de Synton. Together they had: 
 Sir William Keith, Marischal of Scotland, succeeded his father as 12th Marischal of Scotland.
 John Keith, who married (with a dispensation dated 12 March 1368/9) Mariota de Cheyne, daughter of Reginald de Cheyne. 
 Catherine Keith, who married Alexander Barclay and were the ancestors of the Barclays of Ury.

He married secondly, Christian Menteith, daughter of Sir John de Menteith, Lord of Arran and his wife Ellen of Mar. They had one daughter: 
 Janet Keith, who married first, Sir David Barclay of Brechin. She married secondly, before 13 April 1370, Sir Thomas Erskine of Erskine.

Notes

References

See also
 Clan Keith

1351 deaths
Year of birth unknown